In the history of Spain, the White Terror was the series of assassinations realized by the Nationalist faction during the Spanish Civil War (1936–1939), and during the first nine years of the régime of General Francisco Franco. Thousands of victims are buried in hundreds of unmarked common graves (over 2,000), more than 600 in Andalusia alone. The largest of these is the common grave at San Rafael cemetery on the outskirts of Málaga (with perhaps more than 4,000 bodies). The Association for the Recovery of Historical Memory (Asociación para la Recuperación de la Memoria Historica or ARMH) says that the number of disappeared is over 35,000.

Concrete figures do not exist, as many supporters and sympathizers of the Republic fled Spain after losing the Civil War. Furthermore, the Francoist government destroyed thousands of documents relating to the White Terror and tried to hide the executions of the Republicans. Gabriel Jackson states that:

Scholarly estimates of the White Terror's death toll

There is no concrete number, but there is a variety estimates of those murdered during the Francoist Repression.

Deaths from the White Terror in individual regions and provinces
There are, however, concrete regional and partial figures as compared to the figures to the amount killed in Spain overall. 
For example, in the province of Córdoba the victims of the White Terror number 9,579 (the historian Francisco Moreno Gómez has increased the number to 11,581). 
On the other hand, the victims of the Red Terror in the same province come to 2,060. According to the historian Francisco Espinosa, the victims of the Nationalists in only five Spanish provinces (Seville, Cádiz, Huelva, a part of Badajoz and a part of Cordoba) out of fifty were 25,000. The historian Paul Preston says that the number of victims judicially executed in 36 out 50 Spanish provinces were 92,462 (many other victims were executed without a trial). They died either as a result of the Nationalist repression during the war or as a result of the Francoist State's repression after the war.
Other provincial number breakdowns are as follows:

Deaths from the White Terror in individual cities and comarcas
There are also various studies with concrete figures of the deaths caused by the White Terror in specific municipalities, comarcas or metropolitan areas. Local/comarcal figures can be inconsistent with the provincial/regional ones because they tend to be more accurate and complete.

Notes

References